Umurbey is a neighborhood of Gemlik in Bursa Province, Turkey.

Celal Bayar Memorial Tomb and a large park around it, Celal Bayar Foundation Museum, library, Bayar monument-statue are located in Umurbey's Square. Above the square can be seen the 19th century museum house where Celal Bayar was born in 1883.

The son of Aykut Alp, the commander of the sea front in the siege of Gemlik, was buried in Umurbey, a place overlooking the sea upon the will of Kara Ali Pasha Tomb.

Population

References

External links 
 yerelnet.org.tr

Villages in Gemlik District